Qualification for men's artistic gymnastic competitions at the 2017 Summer Universiade was held at the Taipei Nangang Exhibition Center, Hall 1, 4F on 19–20 August 2017. The results of the qualification determined the qualifiers to the finals: 8 teams in the team final, 24 gymnasts in the all-around final, and 8 gymnasts in each of six apparatus finals. The competition was divided to 3 subdivisions.

Subdivisions
Gymnasts from nations taking part in the team all-around event are grouped together while the other gymnasts are grouped into one of six mixed groups. The groups were divided into the three subdivisions after a draw held by the Fédération Internationale de Gymnastique. The groups rotate through each of the four apparatuses together.

Subdivision 1

Subdivision 2

Subdivision 3

Gymnastics at the 2017 Summer Universiade